The Ryvita Company was established in 1925 by John Edwin Garratt, with a bakery set up in Birmingham two years later, producing one of the first packaged goods in the bakery field. After the Second World War, Poole on the South Coast of England was selected as a desirable site for production due to its nearby port. Ryvita is a rye-based crispbread manufactured by the Ryvita Company.

In 1949, Garfield Weston bought the Ryvita Company and began a close personal involvement with the parent company, Associated British Foods (ABF).

Associated British Foods merged the Ryvita Company with Jordans in 2009. It is now part of The Jordans & Ryvita Company Limited, a subsidiary of ABF.

The Jordans & Ryvita Company Limited holds a royal warrant granted by Queen Elizabeth II as manufacturers of crispbreads.

See also
 List of bakeries

References

External links
 

Food and drink companies of the United Kingdom
Bakeries of the United Kingdom
Food and drink companies established in 1925
Retail companies established in 1925